Andrea Meikle (née Crowther) (born 18 November 1963) is a former association football player who represented New Zealand at international level.

Meikle made her Football Ferns début in a 1–2 loss to Chinese Taipei on 2 April 1986, and made just one further appearance later that same year.

References

1963 births
Living people
New Zealand women's international footballers
New Zealand women's association footballers
Women's association footballers not categorized by position